William Burrell was a Scottish merchant.

William Burrell may also refer to:

Sir William Burrell, 2nd Baronet, English antiquarian
Bill Burrell, American football player

See also
Burrell (surname)